The 2013 UCI Women's Road World Cup is the 16th edition of the UCI Women's Road World Cup. The calendar retained the same races as the 2012 edition. Marianne Vos is the defending champion.



Races

Source

Points standings

Individuals
World Cup individual standings after 8 of 8 races.

Source

Teams
World Cup Team standings after 8 of 8 races.

Source

References

External links
Official site

See also
2013 in women's road cycling

 
UCI Women's Road World Cup
UCI Women's Road World Cup